The Parsec Awards were a set of annual awards created to recognize excellence in science fiction podcasts and podcast novels. The awards were created by Mur Lafferty, Tracy Hickman and Michael R. Mennenga and awarded by FarPoint Media. They were first presented in 2006 at DragonCon. In 2009 the awards were described as "one of the most recognizable honors in science and fiction podcasting". The awards were given from 2006 to 2018.

Nominations were accepted from the listening public annually in each of the categories. The list was vetted for eligibility by the steering committee before producers were invited to submit samples of work for consideration by a panel of judges. The panel reduced the list of nominees to five finalists in each category. The finalists' work was submitted for judging and the winner was selected by that panel of authors, podcasters, and others knowledgeable in the field of speculative fiction, podcasting, and/or publishing. Past finalist judges have included Catherine Asaro, Charles de Lint, Cory Doctorow, and Evo Terra.

The awards were last presented in 2018.

Winners

References

External links 
 

Science fiction websites
Podcasting awards